Kontrasta is a hamlet and concejo located in the municipality of Harana/Valle de Arana, in Álava province, Basque Country, Spain.

References

External links
 
Concejos in Harana/Valle de Arana